Valhalla Entertainment Productions, Inc. is an American film and television production company. Their productions include AMC's The Walking Dead television series, its companion series, Fear the Walking Dead, and the spin-off, The Walking Dead: World Beyond.

History
Formerly Pacific Western Productions, the company was founded by producer Gale Anne Hurd in 1982, and it was folded into Valhalla Motion Pictures in 2000.

In 1988, Gale Anne Hurd launched a label No Frills Film, devoted to producing lower budget and independent films, usually with the nature of B-movie. In 1993, No Frills Film was merged into Pacific Western Productions.

Five years later, Gale Anne Hurd formed another production label, Valhalla Motion Pictures, which was ultimately merged with Pacific Western Productions in 2000. The same year it signed a first-look deal with Kinowelt USA, which was acquired by StudioCanal after Kinowelt was forced into bankruptcy.

In 2001, Valhalla Motion Pictures launched a television division that its main focus was on producing television shows and movies for networks and syndication.

Valhalla had an overall deal with Universal Cable Productions to develop new television and digital programs, which was renewed in 2015. Valhalla produced USA Network's drama series, Falling Water, and Amazon's original series, Lore.

In the comic book industry, Valhalla has created a six-issue mini-series comic book, The Scourge, for Aspen Comics, and a four-issue comic book mini-series, ANTI, for 12 Gauge Comics. Dead Man's Run, which was created for Aspen Comics by Greg Pak.

On February 7, 2017, Valhalla Motion Pictures merged into Valhalla Entertainment, which was originally formed in 1996.

Filmography

Films

Comic books

Documentaries

Television

Television shows

Television movies

Logo
On March 24, 2016, the United States Patent and Trademark Office denied a trademark registration by Valhalla Game Studios on the grounds there was likelihood of confusion between Valhalla Motion Pictures and Valhalla Games Studios' mark.

Notes

References

External links
Official company website
Official Twitter page
Official Facebook page

Film production companies of the United States
Television production companies of the United States
Entertainment companies established in 1982
Entertainment companies based in California
1982 establishments in California